Brig. Firmino Ayres Airport  is the airport serving Patos, Brazil.

History
The airport was commissioned on 12 December 1942.

Airlines and destinations

Access

See also

List of airports in Brazil

References

External links

Airports in Paraíba